Schinia alencis is a moth of the family Noctuidae. It is found from south-eastern Colorado to south-eastern Arizona east to western Oklahoma, northern Texas to south-western and south-eastern Texas.

The wingspan is 22–23 mm.

The larvae probably feed on Heterotheca canescens.

External links
Images
Systematics of Schinia chrysellus (Grote) complex: Revised status of Schinia alencis (Harvey) with a description of two new species (Lepidoptera: Noctuidae: Heliothinae)

Schinia
Moths of North America
Moths described in 1875

Taxa named by Leon F. Harvey